Ziad Ahmed Bahaa-Eldin (born 30 August 1964) is an Egyptian economist, commercial lawyer and politician.

Biography
Ziad Bahaa-Eldin was born on 30 August 1964 and is the son of the journalist and writer Ahmad Baha-Eldin. He was educated at Cairo University (Law, 1986), the American University in Cairo (Economics, 1987), King's College London (LLM, 1989) and the London School of Economics (PhD, 1996). Baha Eddin practiced as a lawyer, held several government positions related to finance and law, and served as a lecturer at the Law Faculty of Cairo University. From 2004 to 2007 he was the chairman of the Egyptian Investment Authority. In 2008 he became the head of the Egyptian Financial Supervisory Authority, a government agency that supervises Egypt's non-banking financial transactions and markets. He has served as an International Advisor at Goldman Sachs.

Following the overthrow of Hosni Mubarak in 2011, he was one of the founders of the Egyptian Social Democratic Party and was a member of parliament. News reports on 7 July 2013 stated that he was likely to be appointed interim prime minister by the authorities that seized power in the 2013 Egyptian coup, though this appointment was blocked within the post-coup coalition by the Salafist Al Nour Party. On 12 July 2013 Al Arabiya reported that he had been chosen as Egypt's interim deputy prime minister. After his appointment he suspended his membership in the Social Democratic Party. He resigned on 27 January 2014.

References

21st-century Egyptian politicians
1964 births
Alumni of King's College London
Alumni of the London School of Economics
The American University in Cairo alumni
Beblawi Cabinet
Cairo University alumni
20th-century Egyptian economists
20th-century Egyptian lawyers
Goldman Sachs people
International Cooperation ministers of Egypt
Living people
21st-century Egyptian economists
Chevening Scholars